Koppel, Koppell, or Kopel may refer to:
 6361 Koppel, a minor planet
 Köppel (Westerwald), a summit and viewing tower in the Montabaur Heights, Westerwald, Germany
 Koppel, Pennsylvania, U.S.
 Orenstein and Koppel GmbH, a German engineering company (1876-1999)
 Koppel (surname)
 Koppel (headware), also kippah or yarmulke, traditionally worn by Jewish males

See also
 Coppel, a Mexican department store
 Coppell (disambiguation)
 Koeppel (disambiguation)